Lin Liyun (born 22 March 1933) is a Chinese politician who served as president of the  from 1981 to 1991, vice chairperson of the National People's Congress Overseas Chinese Affairs Committee from 1991 to 1998, and vice president of the All-China Federation of Returned Overseas Chinese from 1994 to 2004.

She was a member of the Standing Committee of the 4th, 5th, 6th, 7th, 8th, and 9th National People's Congress. She was a member of the 10th, 11th, 12th, 13th, 14th and 15th Central Committee of the Chinese Communist Party.

Biography
Lin was born in Kiyomizu Town, Taichū Prefecture, Taiwan (now Qingshui District of Taichung, Taiwan) on 22 March 1933, while her ancestral home in Jinjiang, Fujian. Her father Lin Shuiyong was a businessman. Four years later, her family emigrated to Kobe, Japan, where she lived for a total of 11 years. In school, she organized "Taiwanese Students' Association in Japan" and "Reading Association" with her classmates, and read Mao Zedong's On New Democracy and Edgar Snow's Red Star over China and other works, which made her feel good about the Chinese Communist Party.

In July 1952, Lin came to mainland China via British Hong Kong and was admitted to the Department of Biology, Peking University. Beginning in 1953, she served in several posts in the International Liaison Department of the Chinese Communist Party, including graduate student, deputy director, and director. After the Cultural Revolution, in October 1978, she was promoted to become vice president of the All-China Women's Federation and secretary of its secretariat. She also served as vice president of the All-China Federation of Returned Overseas Chinese from June 1994 to August 2004.

In September 2007, Lin became dean of the School of Foreign Languages, Nankai University, a post she kept until September 2011.

Personal life
Lin was married to Huang Li, with whom she has a son and a daughter.

Contributions
Since the 1950s, Lin has worked as a Japanese interpreter for Mao Zedong, Liu Shaoqi, Zhou Enlai, Zhu De, Deng Xiaoping and other party and state leaders, and participated in the negotiation of the establishment of diplomatic relations between China and Japan in 1972.

References

Bibliography
 

1933 births
Living people
People from Taichung
Peking University alumni
Japanese–Chinese translators
20th-century Chinese women politicians
21st-century Chinese women politicians
21st-century Chinese politicians
Members of the Standing Committee of the 4th National People's Congress
Members of the Standing Committee of the 5th National People's Congress
Members of the Standing Committee of the 6th National People's Congress
Members of the Standing Committee of the 7th National People's Congress
Members of the Standing Committee of the 8th National People's Congress
Members of the Standing Committee of the 9th National People's Congress
Members of the 10th Central Committee of the Chinese Communist Party
Members of the 11th Central Committee of the Chinese Communist Party
Members of the 12th Central Committee of the Chinese Communist Party
Members of the 13th Central Committee of the Chinese Communist Party
Members of the 14th Central Committee of the Chinese Communist Party
Members of the 15th Central Committee of the Chinese Communist Party